

The Bishop Wand Church of England School is a secondary school with academy status located in Sunbury-on-Thames, England. The school has been co-educational since its founding and caters for students in the 11–18 age range in that it has its own sixth form. The school has six houses, named after relevant Anglican dioceses to the life of its namesake, Bishop Wand, which compete in sports and other activities.

History
The Bishop Wand Church of England School was founded in 1969 to serve, alongside non-Anglican schools and a few fellow Anglican-ethos schools, the borough of Spelthorne and the London Boroughs of Richmond upon Thames and Hounslow.
 
The prominent Anglican cleric for whom the school is named is Bishop William Wand who served 22 years as a Bishop then resigned in 1956 to serve as Canon and Treasurer of St Paul's Cathedral in London. His first position was Archbishop of Brisbane and he finished in post as Bishop of London. He ministered to many people over his lifetime (1885 – 1977) and worked in many cities and towns. Bishop Wand School decided to choose some of the places where the Bishop visited and ministered as its House names.

A small minority of the parish land has long belonged to St Paul's in return for annual funding and the right to appoint the vicar: in 1222 the right to appoint the vicar of Sunbury-on-Thames was transferred along with the manor from Westminster Abbey to the body representing the cathedral, the Dean and Chapter of St. Paul's. By the agreement which gave effect to this St. Paul's were to appropriate the church, ordaining a perpetual and well-endowed vicarage. St Paul's at the direction of its Diocese of London gave up much of its remaining land to endow the school.

Facilities
The facilities at the Bishop Wand Church of England School include a three-floor main building and buildings for:
Languages
Mathematics
The sciences
Lunch hall
Various subjects studied (the Bishop's Building)
Sports block
Other sports and fitness facilities include:
AstroTurf courts 
Designated fields for outdoor sports.

Notable alumni
Adam London, cricketer
Glenn Fabry, comic book artist
 Matthew Parker (priest), Archdeacon of Stoke

References

External links
School website

Secondary schools in Surrey
Sunbury-on-Thames
Church of England secondary schools in the Diocese of Guildford
Academies in Surrey